The 2019 Prosperita Open was a professional tennis tournament played on clay courts. It was the 16th edition of the tournament which was part of the 2019 ATP Challenger Tour. It took place in Ostrava, Czech Republic between 29 April and 5 May.

Singles main-draw entrants

Seeds

 1 Rankings are as of 22 April 2019.

Other entrants
The following players received wildcards into the singles main draw:
  Marek Gengel
  Jiří Lehečka
  Tomáš Macháč
  David Poljak
  Dalibor Svrčina

The following player received entry into the singles main draw using a protected ranking:
  Pere Riba

The following player received entry into the singles main draw as an alternate:
  Andrea Vavassori

The following players received entry into the singles main draw using their ITF World Tennis Ranking:
  Riccardo Bonadio
  Ivan Gakhov
  Peter Heller
  Vít Kopřiva
  Alexander Zhurbin

The following players received entry from the qualifying draw:
  Enrico Dalla Valle
  Jonáš Forejtek

Champions

Singles
 
 Kamil Majchrzak def.  Jannik Sinner 6–1, 6–0.

Doubles

 Luca Margaroli /  Filip Polášek def.  Thiemo de Bakker /  Tallon Griekspoor 6–4, 2–6, [10–8].

References

External links
Official Website

2019 ATP Challenger Tour
2019
2019 in Czech tennis
April 2019 sports events in Europe
May 2019 sports events in Europe